Tetracha impressa, the upland metallic tiger beetle, is a species of big-headed tiger beetle in the family Carabidae. It is found in Central America and North America.

References

Further reading

 

Cicindelidae
Articles created by Qbugbot
Beetles described in 1841